Karsten Albert (born 13 October 1968) is a German luger who competed from 1998 to 2003. He won a silver medal in the mixed team event at the 2001 FIL World Luge Championships in Calgary, Alberta, Canada.

Albert also won three medals at the FIL European Luge Championships with one gold (Mixed team: 1998) and two silvers (Men's singles: 1998, Mixed team: 2000. Albert also finished sixth in the men's singles event at the 2002 Winter Olympics in Salt Lake City.

References

FIL-Luge profile
Hickok sports information on World champions in luge and skeleton.
List of European luge champions

External links
 
 
 

1968 births
Living people
People from Friedrichroda
People from Bezirk Erfurt
German male lugers
Sportspeople from Thuringia
Olympic lugers of Germany
Lugers at the 1998 Winter Olympics
Lugers at the 2002 Winter Olympics
21st-century German people